Curtis Malloch is a Canadian politician, who was elected to the Legislative Assembly of New Brunswick in the 2010 provincial election. He represented the electoral district of Charlotte-Campobello as a member of the Progressive Conservatives  until the 2014 provincial election, when he was defeated by John Ames.

References

Progressive Conservative Party of New Brunswick MLAs
People from Charlotte County, New Brunswick
Living people
21st-century Canadian politicians
Year of birth missing (living people)